Washington's Headquarters State Historic Site, also called Hasbrouck House, is located in Newburgh, New York overlooking the Hudson River. George Washington lived there while he was in command of the Continental Army during the final year of the American Revolutionary War; it had the longest tenure as his headquarters of any place he had used.

In 1961 the house was designated a state historic site. It is also the oldest house in the city of Newburgh, and the first property acquired and preserved by any U.S. state for historic reasons.

History

The first fieldstone farmhouse on the site may have been built in 1725 by Burger Mynderse.  The property was sold to Elsie Hasbrouck, and she in turn gave it to her son, Jonathan, who married Catherine (Tryntje) Dubois and they built the existing structure on the original foundation, if any, in 1750. The house was surrounded by a large stock farm. The home underwent two significant enlargements before it was completed in 1770.  The home has an original "Dutch Jambless" fireplace. A temporary kitchen was built by the Continental Army upon their arrival in 1782.  Other changes were made inside the house including the addition of an "English" style fireplace in General Washington's bedroom. Existing buildings such as stables and barns were also enlarged and improved on the site. Most Army buildings were removed by the Quartermaster-General's Office at the end of the war, with the exception of a "House in the garden", which was given to Mrs. Hasbrouck. It no longer exists.

In 1850, it was acquired by the State of New York and became the first publicly operated historic site in the country. Today, it is a museum furnished to recreate its condition during the Revolutionary War. It covers an area of about seven acres (2.8 ha), with three buildings: Hasbrouck House, a museum (built in 1910), a monument named the "Tower of Victory", which was completed in 1890 after four years of construction in order to commemorate the centennial of Washington's stay, and a maintenance shed/garage built in the Colonial Revival style in 1942.

Also on the property is the grave of Uzal Knapp, one of the longest-lived veterans of the Continental Army. For many years it was believed that he had served as one of Washington's personal guards, but more recently historians have come to doubt this.

There is a statue entitled The Minuteman, by Henry Hudson Kitson, that was erected on the grounds on November 11, 1924.

The site was declared a National Historic Landmark in 1961.

Washington's headquarters
Hasbrouck House served as Washington's headquarters during the Revolutionary War from April 1782 until August 1783. It was chosen for its comparatively safe location north of the strategically important West Point.

Washington established his headquarters here on Sunday, March 31, 1782.

The 7,000 troops of the Continental Army were encamped near what is today known as Vails Gate, a few miles to the southwest.

In the headquarters at Hasbrouck House, Washington rejected the Newburgh letter, a suggestion to institute an American monarchy, and defused the Newburgh conspiracy and threat of a mutiny among his officers over pay and pensions.

On August 7, 1782, while the Continental troops were encamped around the vicinity of the House, Washington issued his first proclamation, a general order which established a Badge of Military Merit, to enlisted men and non-commissioned officers for long and faithful service and for acts of heroism, which was the forerunner of the Purple Heart. His headquarters was the first place the badge of merit was awarded to American troops.

Washington left the Newburgh headquarters on the morning of August 31 and moved the army to Verplanck's point where they arrived that evening.

On April 19, 1783, after returning to Newburgh, Washington issued an order for the "cessation of hostilities", and gave his Proclamation of Peace, which formally ended the fighting of the Revolutionary War.

Honors and commemoration

On July 4, 1850 Major General Winfield Scott raised a flag at the opening ceremony and dedication for Washington's headquarters.
The U.S. Post Office issued a commemorative stamp featuring an accurate depiction of Washington's Headquarters at Hasbrouck House, overlooking the Hudson River, at Newburgh, New York, on April 19, 1933, the 150th anniversary of the proclamation of peace, issued by Washington in his headquarters, which officially ended the Revolutionary War in 1783.

See also

List of Washington's Headquarters during the Revolutionary War
List of National Historic Landmarks in New York
National Register of Historic Places listings in Orange County, New York
Knox's Headquarters State Historic Site, headquarters of General Henry Knox, also a National Historic Landmark in New Windsor
New Windsor Cantonment State Historic Site, final encampment of Continental Army in nearby New Windsor

References

Bibliography
 , E'book
 , E'book
 , Book
 , Book

External links

Official site: Washington's Headquarters State Historic Site, at New York State
Site Report by Save America's Treasures
Story on Washington in Newburgh
Hudson River Valley National Heritage Area
26 photos of Hasbrouck House / Washington's Headquarters (click icon at top left), at Historic American Buildings Survey
Renovation of the George Washington Headquarters

New York (state) historic sites
New York (state) in the American Revolution
Palisades Interstate Park system
American Revolutionary War sites
National Register of Historic Places in Orange County, New York
Tourist attractions in Orange County, New York
Houses completed in 1725
Newburgh, New York
Hudson River
National Historic Landmarks in New York (state)
Museums in Orange County, New York
American Revolutionary War museums in New York (state)
Historic house museums in New York (state)
Houses in Orange County, New York
Monuments and memorials to George Washington in the United States
1725 establishments in the Province of New York
Buildings and structures in Newburgh, New York
Homes of United States Founding Fathers